Brooke Dillman (born Brooke Alley; August 22, 1966) is an American actress and comedian best known as a series regular on the skit comedy Blue Collar TV.

Early life and education
Dillman was born in Kansas City, Missouri. She attended Shawnee Mission East High School in Prairie Village, Kansas. She earned a Bachelor of Arts degree in theater at the University of Missouri in 1988 and then moved to Chicago.

Career 
While in Chicago, Dillman created several of her favorite characters in the local theater scene, including stints at the Factory Theatre and the Organic Theatre. She then moved to Los Angeles in 1998 and was featured in TV commercials prior to being cast as a regular on the variety series The Wayne Brady Show.

Other roles followed, such as the weather-casting nun, Sister Brenda Trogman, in NBC's Good Morning, Miami, a blind date for Michael Scott in the NBC's The Office episode "Chair Model" from season 4, and a recurring role on HBO's Six Feet Under. Dillman has appeared in the feature films National Lampoon's Barely Legal, Larceny, Pot of Gold, and Superbad. After the final season of the sketch comedy TV series Blue Collar TV, in which she was a regular cast member, Dillman reunited with Blue Collar comedian Larry the Cable Guy in his film Larry the Cable Guy: Health Inspector.
She also appeared on the YouTube comedy-mystery web series 'Where the Bears Are' in Episode 7 "A bear and Honey" on 23 Aug 2012 as 'Honey Garrett'.

She also has a recurring role in the Disney XD show Kickin' It as Joan Malone, the security guard at the strip mall, and played Tink Babbitt on ABC’s The Middle from 2009 to 2018. Dillman also played a role in Good Luck Charlie as Karen, Amy Duncan's boss and enemy.
She also starred for three seasons on the TBS comedy Wrecked as Karen Cushman.

Filmography

Film

Television

References

External links
 

1966 births
Living people
Actresses from Kansas City, Missouri
Comedians from Missouri
American women comedians
American film actresses
American television actresses
University of Missouri alumni
20th-century American actresses
21st-century American actresses
20th-century American comedians
21st-century American comedians